Ecunha  is a town and municipality in the province of Huambo, Angola. The municipality had a population of 82,541 in 2014.

References

External links
 Official website
 View on Wikimapia

Populated places in Huambo Province
Municipalities of Angola